Stephen Van Rensselaer is the name of:

Stephen van Rensselaer I (1707–1747), eighth patroon of Rensselaerswyck
Stephen van Rensselaer II (1742–1769), ninth patroon of Rensselaerswyck
Stephen Van Rensselaer (1764–1839), eleventh (and last) patroon of Rensselaerswyck and member of the United States House of Representatives from New York
Stephen Van Rensselaer IV (1789–1868), owner of the "West Manor" of Rensselaerswyck upon his father's death